It's Only Rock and Roll may refer to:

It's Only Rock 'n Roll, a 1974 album by The Rolling Stones
"It's Only Rock 'n Roll (But I Like It)", a 1974 song and lead single from the above album
It's Only Rock & Roll (Waylon Jennings album), a 1983 album by Waylon Jennings
It's Only Rock 'n' Roll (Hardcore Superstar album), a 1997 album by Hardcore Superstar
"It's Only Rock and Roll" (Only Fools and Horses), a 1985 episode of the British sitcom, Only Fools and Horses
It's Only Rock & Roll (TV series), a Canadian television variety show, which aired on CBC Television as a summer series in 1987